Milan Ristić may refer to:

Milan Ristić (athlete) (born 1991), Serbian hurdler
Milan Ristić (composer) (1908–1982), Serbian composer